Kebumen is a town on the island of Java, Indonesia and is the administrative centre of Kebumen Regency, in Central Java Province. It is also the name of the main town of the district of Kebumen. The population of the town at the 2010 Census was 118,847, while the 2020 Census gave a total of 131,750. Kebumen has other names - "Swallow City", "City Tours", and "the city of culture".

Geography
Kebumen is located near the Indian Ocean, it is also called Samudera Indonesia. The town is bisected by the Kali Lukulo (Lukulo River). It lies near three major roads, Jalan Pahlawan, Jalan HM. Sarbini and Jalan Ronggowarsito.

Climate
Kebumen has a tropical rainforest climate (Af) with moderate rainfall from June to September and heavy to very heavy rainfall from November to May.

Demographics 
The population is almost entirely Javanese and over 96% Muslim. The village of Kebumen has a multi-religious population.

Economy 
The agricultural sector is quite dominant role in the economy Kebumen. Donations GDP reached 44.77 percent contained. Agricultural commodities mainstay of this region is the product of food crops, especially rice, cassava, soybean and coconut plantations especially. Then from the Tourism sector also supports the economy of Kebumen.

Leaders

University / College 
 Nahdlatul Ulama Ma'arif University (:id:Universitas Ma'arif Nahdlatul Ulama Kebumen)
 Dharma Patria Polytechnic (:id:Politeknik Dharma Patria Kebumen)
 Nahdlatul Ulama Islamic Institute (previous name STAINU Kebumen) (:id:Institut Agama Islam Nahdlatul Ulama Kebumen)
 Sebelas Maret University Campus VI PGSD Kebumen (:id:Universitas Sebelas Maret Kampus VI PGSD Kebumen)
 Putra Bangsa Institute of Economic Science (:id:Sekolah Tinggi Ilmu Ekonomi Putra Bangsa)
 Academy of Information and Computer Management PGRI (:id:Akademi Manajemen Informatika dan Komputer PGRI Kebumen)
 Muhammadiyah Institute of Technology (:id:Sekolah Tinggi Teknologi Muhammadiyah Kebumen)

Mass media 
Kebumen has a relatively complete mass media, both print and electronic media. Currently in Kebumen region has published a daily newspaper "Kebumen Express", which is part of Jawa Pos Group.

For electronic media, there are several commercial radio stations and one Kebumen district government-owned public radio, and a local television station.

Radio 
Radio in FM:
 Bimasakti FM
 Mas FM
 Radio DVK
 Ardana FM

Television 
 Ratih TV Kebumen (47 UHF), Kebumen government-owned television

Sports

Football 
Kebumen Regency also has a football team, under the name Persak Kebumen which stands for Indonesian Football Association of Kebumen. This team in the 2008-2011 period held a competition in the Indonesian Third Division. Persak Kebumen played in the 2014-2015 period playing in the Nusantara League competition. After the return of the Indonesian League, Persak Kebumen played in Liga 3 in 2019. Chandradimuka Stadium is a home venue of Persak Kebumen.

Futsal 
In addition to football clubs, Kebumen Regency has a professional futsal club namely SKN FC Kebumen. SKN FC Kebumen played in the Indonesia Pro Futsal League since 2018 as runner up. The competition that followed was 2018 AFF Futsal Championship as a semifinalist.

People 
 Sutoyo Siswomiharjo, a Heroes of the Revolution Indonesia.

See also

 Persak Kebumen
 SKN FC Kebumen

References

External links